École secondaire Père-René-de-Galinée, also known as PRDG, is a French Catholic secondary school located in Cambridge, Ontario, Canada. The school is part of the Conseil scolaire catholique MonAvenir The school was founded in 1996 after the creation of CSDCCS.

Academics

PRDG is renowned in Waterloo Region for its high standard of French education as well as its International Baccalaureate program.

Offering the Middle Years program, students are challenged to think outside the box in order to solve issues of the day.

Sports
PRDG is a member of the eight-team District 8 Athletic Association

PRDG made their first CWOSSA and OFSAA appearance in the 2009-2010 school year for senior boys soccer. They made it to the quarterfinals in Windsor at OFSAA.

The school also has hockey and basketball teams. They do not have a football team like most high schools do, but students are currently peacefully protesting by signing petitions and writing emails to the principal.

Charity work

Beyond academic achievement, PRDG has done quite a bit of charity work. Every student has the responsibility to contribute to society. Like many other organizations in the area, the school is well known for its volunteer and charity work. Every student is encouraged to recycle and to stop pollution.

See also
List of high schools in Ontario

References

High schools in the Regional Municipality of Waterloo
French-language high schools in Ontario
Ecole
International Baccalaureate schools in Ontario
Catholic secondary schools in Ontario
Educational institutions established in 1996
1996 establishments in Ontario